Scalidognathus is a genus of Asian armored trapdoor spiders that was first described by Ferdinand Anton Franz Karsch in 1892. Originally placed with the Ctenizidae, it was moved to the Idiopidae in 1985.

Species
 it contains six species:
Scalidognathus montanus (Pocock, 1900) – India
Scalidognathus nigriaraneus Sanap & Mirza, 2011 – India
Scalidognathus oreophilus Simon, 1892 – Sri Lanka
Scalidognathus radialis (O. Pickard-Cambridge, 1869) (type) – Sri Lanka
Scalidognathus seticeps Karsch, 1892 – Sri Lanka
Scalidognathus tigerinus Sanap & Mirza, 2011 – India

See also
 List of Idiopidae species
 List of spiders of India

References

Idiopidae
Mygalomorphae genera
Spiders of Africa
Spiders of Asia